The Siva Prasad Barooah National Award is an Indian award given to individuals and groups in India for outstanding contribution to journalism, to promote news media excellence. It was instituted by the Kamal Kumari Foundation in 1999 in memory of Siva Prasad Barooah, the renowned tea-planter, philanthropist, politician, humanist and also the publisher of Batori, the first Assamese daily newspaper in Assam. He belongs to the famous Khongiya Barooah family of Thengal, Assam. The first award went to The Assam Tribune.

List of Awardees

See also
Kamal Kumari Barooah
Siva Prasad Barooah
Kamal Kumari National Award
The Kamal Kumari Foundation

References

Kamal Kumari awards announced
Syam Sharma selected for Kamal Kumari Award
Kamal Kumari National Awards Presented
Kamal Kumari awards presented

External links
Official Website

Assamese-language mass media
Awards established in 1999
Indian awards
Indian journalism awards
1999 establishments in India